Wilda Octaviana Situngkir (born October 27, 1995) also popularly known as Wilda Octaviana is an Indonesian Child Protection Commission Ambassador, Indonesian National Agency of Drug and Food Control Ambassador, actress and model who won the title of Puteri Indonesia Pariwisata 2018. She represented Indonesia at the Miss Supranational 2018 pageant, where she placed as the 3rd runner-up, repeating the same achievement by Cokorda Istri Krisnanda Widani in Miss Supranational 2013, Wilda became the fifth Indonesian to be placed as a finalist in Miss Supranational history, continuing the ongoing 4th year placement streaks of Indonesia, consecutively since Gresya Amanda Maaliwuga in 2015, Intan Aletrinö in 2016 and Karina Nadila Niab in 2017.

Early life and education

Wilda was born in Jakarta – Indonesia, from a traditional Dayak mixed Batak tribe, then she moved to her father hometown in Pontianak, West Kalimantan. She holds a bachelor's degree in Science in Agriculture from Universitas Panca Bhakti, Pontianak, West Kalimantan, Indonesia. She is currently finishing her Master degree in Business management from PPM School of Management.

On 11 March 2019, Wilda was elected as The Indonesian Child Protection Commission Ambassador by the Minister Dr. Susanto, MA and People's Representative Council. On 25 November 2019, Wilda was elected as The Ambassador of The National Agency of Drug and Food Control of The Republic of Indonesia by the Minister Penny Kusumastuti Lukito.

Pageantry

Miss Earth Indonesia 2017 and Puteri West Kalimantan 2018
Before competing in Puteri Indonesia 2018, Wilda competed in Miss Earth Indonesia 2017, where she won "Miss Photogenic" special award. In 2018, Wilda competed in the regional pageant of Puteri West Kalimantan 2018, winning the title to represent her province West Kalimantan in Puteri Indonesia 2018.

Puteri Indonesia 2018
Wilda represented the West Kalimantan province at Puteri Indonesia 2018. At the end of the event, Wilda was crowned Puteri Indonesia Pariwisata 2018 at the finals held at the Jakarta Convention Center, Jakarta, on March 9, 2018, by the outgoing titleholder of Puteri Indonesia Pariwisata 2017, Karina Nadila Niab of East Nusa Tenggara.

The finale coronation night of Puteri Indonesia 2018 was attended by the reigning Miss Supranational 2017 – Jenny Kim of Korea as a main Guest-star. Wilda was crowned together with her two bestfriends, Sonia Fergina Citra as Puteri Indonesia 2018 and Vania Fitryanti Herlambang as Puteri Indonesia Lingkungan 2018. They're appear on the magazine cover of Tatler Indonesia together with Mooryati Soedibyo.

Miss Supranational 2018
As Puteri Indonesia Pariwisata 2018, Wilda represented Indonesia at the 10th edition of Miss Supranational 2018 pageant in Hala MOSiR Arena, Krynica-Zdrój, Poland. The finale coronation night of the pageant was held on December 7, 2019, Wilda competed with the other 72 countries, where she ended-up crowned as the "3rd runner-up" of Miss Supranational 2018.

Beside of that, she also managed to won several awards from winning "Best National Costume", "Miss Supramodel Asia", "Miss Popularity" and "Miss Global Beauties Choice". Her national costume designed by the Jember Fashion Carnaval, bringing the Indonesian thanksgiving costume named The Sacred Hudoq which is  inspired from a Dayak folk legend.

Filmography

Wilda has acted on several television films and cinema films. Since 2022, she also hosted some TV programmes.

Movies

Television films

Television programmes

See also

 Puteri Indonesia 2018
 Miss Supranational 2018
 Sonia Fergina Citra
 Vania Fitryanti Herlambang

References

External links
 Wilda Octaviana Official Instagram
 

Living people
1995 births
Puteri Indonesia winners
Miss Supranational contestants
Mental health activists
Indonesian beauty pageant winners
Indonesian female models
Indonesian Christians
People from Jakarta
People from Pontianak
People from West Kalimantan
People of Batak descent